The Pembina River is a tributary of the Athabasca River in central Alberta, Canada. "Pembina"  is a Canadian French name for the high bush cranberry (Viburnum trilobum). The river gives the name to the Pembina oil field, an oil- and gas-producing region centered on Drayton Valley. The environmentalist group Pembina Institute also took its name from the river.

Course

The Pembina River originates in the Canadian Rockies foothills, south of Cadomin, at Pembina Forks. Water originating in the Pembina River goes through numerous merges until reaching the Mackenzie River, discharging into the Arctic Ocean.

Communities located along the Pembina River include Westlock, Sangudo, Entwistle and Evansburg. Pembina River Provincial Park is along the gorges of the river between Evansburg and Entwistle.

Tributaries

Rat Creek
Bailey Creek
Hanson Creek
Crooked Creek
Centre Creek
Lovett River
Moose Lake
Lund Creek
Fairfax Lake
Errot Lake
Dismal Creek
Wolf Creek
 Wolf Lake
Zeta Lake
Rat Creek
Paddy Creek
Sinkhole Lake
Bigoray River
Mishow Creek
Lobstick River
 Chip Lake, Deep Creek, Alpha Lake, Poison Creek, Beta Lake, Sunset Lake, Brule Creek, Little Brule Creek
Michaud Lake
Coyote Lake Creek
 Ice Lake
Oldman Lake
MacDonald Creek
 Lac La Nonne
Newton Creek
 Newton Lake, George Lake, Kirchner Lake
Paddle River
 Paddle River Reservoir, Little Paddle River
Wabash Creek
 Fernand Lake
Dapp Creek
 Lac des Jones, Bolloque Creek, Muskeg Lake
Shoal Creek
 Shoal Lake, Baird Lake, Camp Creek
Crane Lake
Killsyth Creek
 Killsyth Lake
Flatbrush Creek

Numerous small lakes such as Brock Lake, Oldman Lake, Majeau Lake, Lac La Nonne, George Lake, Armstrong Lake, Shoal Lake, Steele Lake, Cross Lake are also located within the river's basin.

See also
List of rivers of Alberta

References

Rivers of Alberta